Madhabpur is an upazila (sub-district) of Habiganj District, located in Bangladesh's Sylhet Division.

History
Following the Muslim conquest of Taraf in 1304, Fateh Ghazi settled with his nephews in the Raghunandan hills in present-day Madhabpur. He founded the village of Fatehpur, and his dargah (shrine) remains a popular attraction in Madhabpur.

In 1804, a thana (police administrative headquarters) was established in Madhabpur by the British Raj. Later on in the century, the local zamindar Siddheshwari Rai Prasad Chaudhury established a haat bazaar in Madhabpur on the banks of the Sonai River. After 1947, the first CO Office was established in the village of Itakhola in Noapara Union at the house of Rashid Majumdar. It was moved from there to its present location in 1966.

On 4 April 1971, during Bangladesh Liberation War the senior army officers assembled at the headquarters of 2nd East Bengal at Teliapara under Madhabpur Thana, a semi hilly area covered by tea gardens where General MAG Osmani, Lieutenant Colonel Mohammad Abdur Rab, Lieutenant Colonel Salahuddin Mohammad Reja, Major Kazi Nuruzzaman, Major Khaled Mosharraf, Major Nurul Islam, Major Shafaat Jamil, Major Mainul Hossain Chowdhury and others were present. In this meeting four senior commanders were entrusted with the responsibility of operational areas. Sylhet-Brahmanbaria area was placed under the command of Major K. M. Shafiullah, Comilla-Noakhali area was given to Major Khaled Mosharraf while Chittagong-Chittagong Hill Tracts was given to Major Ziaur Rahman and Kushtia-Jessore area was placed under command of Major Abu Osman Chowdhury. In the meeting the organisation concept of the freedom fighter forces and the command structure were chalked out under the command of General MAG Osmani.

Geography
It has 44053 households and total area .

Demographics
As of the 1991 Bangladesh census, Madhabpur has a population of 250069. Males constitute 50.72% of the population, and females 49.28%. This Upazila's eighteen up population is 122903. Madhabpur has an average literacy rate of 23.9% (7+ years), and the national average of 32.4% literate.

Education
Madhabpur has eight total madrasas including Harashpur Darul Uloom Islamia Madrasa and Darus Sunnah Madrasa Mantala. The three qawmi madrasah of Madhabpur are: Kharki Islamia Qasimul Uloom (est. 1896, Sharifuddin), Al-Jamiatul Islamia Ashraful Uloom Maujpur (2004, Maniruzzaman) and Khadijatul Kubra Womens Madrasa Maujpur (2012, Ali Husain).

Administration
Madhabpur Upazila is divided into Madhabpur Municipality and 11 union parishad: Adaoir, Andiura, Bagashura, Bahara, Bulla, Chhatiain, Choumohani, Dharmaghar, Jagadishpur, Noapara, and Shahjahanpur. The union parishads are subdivided into 181 mauzas and 267 villages.

Madhabpur Municipality is subdivided into 9 wards and 12 mahallas.

Upazila Nirbahi Officer (UNO): Tasnuva Nashtaran

Notable people
Fateh Ghazi, Sufi saint and soldier
Md. Mahbub Ali, politician
Mohammed Farashuddin, 7th Governor of Bangladesh Bank

See also
 Upazilas of Bangladesh
 Districts of Bangladesh
 Divisions of Bangladesh

References

Upazilas of Habiganj District